Jargalsaikhan Munkhbayar (born 23 February 1976) is a Mongolian international footballer. He made his first appearance for the Mongolia national football team in 2005.

References

1976 births
Mongolian footballers
Mongolia international footballers
Living people
Association football defenders